Football Club Jonava, previously (1996–2016) known as Football Club Lietava, is a Lithuanian professional football club based in Jonava. The club gained promotion to the A lyga as champions of the I Lyga in 2015, but were relegated from A Lyga in 2018.

History
The club was founded in 1991 as Azotas (after the name of the local Azotas fertilizer factory), the name Lietava was adopted in 1996.

For a number of years the club played in the second tier of the Lithuanian football championship. After successful 2015 season, Lietava won the I Lyga in 2015 and were promoted to the A lyga.

The 2016 debut season in the A Lyga Lietava finished in 5th position.

From the beginning of the 2017 season, Lietava changed its name to FK Jonava. On 13 February 2017 Lithuanian Football Federation approved the name change.
The 2017 season was the best season for the club on record. The team took 6th place in the regular A Lyga season, and finished in the 4th position after the championship round.

For 2018 season club management had ambitious plans. On 11 January 2018, Felipe Ribeiro from Portugal started in a position of the new head coach. But the club ran into problems and on 15 May 2018, the coach was let go. Soon the head coach changed again. The third coach in one season could not save the team from relegation. After the regular season the team took 8th position and ended its spell in the A lyga.

In 2022 was promoted to A Lyga.

Name history

1991 – Azotas
1994 – Achema-Lietava
1996 – Lietava
2017 – Jonava

Stadium

Central Stadium of Jonava is the multi-purpose stadium in Jonava used by Lietava Jonava. The seating capacity is going to be expanded to 3,000. Near the stadium is an outdoor pond, which can be used for water events.

Honours
I Lyga:
Winners(4):
1992–93, 1998–99, 2012, 2015

Kit
From 2017 season FK Jonava colours at home are light blue and white shirts with white arms. Shorts are black and socks are white.

Away kits are usually plain blue. Shirts, shorts and socks.

Goalkeepers kit is purple colour with white signs.

Kit manufacturer

Sponsors

Seasons

Jonava B
The Jonava B team played in II Lyga in 2018 season. However, after the main team was relegated from A Lyga, Jonava B was withdrawn from II Lyga.

Squad

Staff

References

Sources
 Livescore - Football livescores

External links
 
 Facebook official page

 
Football clubs in Lithuania
Jonava
1946 establishments in Lithuania
Association football clubs established in 1946